Theinni or Hsenwi is a town in northern Shan State of Burma, situated near the north bank of the Nam Tu River and now the centre of Hsenwi Township in Lashio District.

After the disruption of the Dali Kingdom by Kublai Khan, Theinni seems to have been the centre of the independent Shan princely states, with various capitals in the Shweli River and Nam Tu River valleys.  This kingdom of Kawsampi was ended by the Burmese in 1738 (or thereabouts), and the country was divided into various states with appointment orders from Ava. Numerous rebellions and civil wars reduced Theinni from its position as arguably the most powerful and populous Shan state to what is perceived as a condition of fearful desolation.  It later regained much population since the British occupation in 1888, but is still far from its old prosperity. The ruins of what was the old capital of Hsenwi State lie at a short distance, and show it to have been a large and well-built town.

History

Historical background

It was the capital of Hsenwi State, by far the largest of the cis-Salween Shan states, and at one time included not only all the territory of the present states of North and South Hsenwi, but also Kehsi Mansam, Mong Hsu, Mong Sang, and Mong Nawng, besides having a sort of protectorate over Mang Lon and other Wa states east of the Salween. These had, however, fallen away in Burmese times, and before the British annexation, Theinni was divided into five parts by name; but there was no central authority, and the whole state was in hopeless disorder. After the pacification of the region in March 1888, the colonial administration divided Theinni into two states: North Theinni, which was assigned to a successful adventurer, Hkun Sang, of Ton Hong, and South Theinni which went to Nawmong, of the old Shan ruling house.  North Theinni with an area of  had a population (1901) of 118,325 persons; estimated revenue, £6000.  South Theinni with an area of  had a population (in 1901) of 67,836; estimated revenue, £4800. Mong Yai was the capital of South Theinni, with a population of about 2000. Lashio, the headquarters of the superintendent of the Northern Shan State, is in North Theinni.

There were a total of 16 rulers in Hsenwi from 1778 to 1888.

The US Air Force attacked it several times during World War II.

Kokang was part of the Hsenwi Saopha territory before Myanmar's independence from the British.

Population

The ethnic groups found in Theinni are predominantly Shan and Jinghpaw, but there are many Chinese, Burmese, Lisu, Lahu, Wa, Palaung and Yanglam people in the town.

Geography
The northern part of North Theinni is a mass of hills affected by the geological fault which has produced the rift that forms the Nam Tu or Myitnge valley, and has thrown up a series of parallel ranges which extend northwards to the Shweli River (Lung Kiang), without altogether destroying the north and south trend which is the characteristic of the Shan hills as a whole. In the valleys between these hills are numerous tracts under rice cultivation, some circular or oval, some mere ribands along the river banks.

The southern portion has much more flat land, along the, line of the Nam Tu, its tributaries the Nam Yao and the Nam Nim, and the Nam Yek flowing into the Salween. This was formerly densely populated, and still remains the most valuable portion of the state. A range running westwards from the Salween, and marking the southern border of the rift in the hills, divides North from South Theinni. It has large, grassy, upland downs. This part of the state has fallen almost entirely into the hands of the Kachins.

The Shans are found in the Nam Mao (Shweli or Lung Kiang) valley, and in the Nam Tu and other valleys in the southern part of the state. The southern valleys are about more than  ft or higher. Apart from this it consists of broken hill-country of no great height, or open rolling downs, the latter chiefly in the eastern half of the state. It is watered by numerous streams, of which the chief is the Nam Pang, an affluent of the Salween.

Rivers
The chief river in the northern state, apart from the Salween, is the Nam Tu or Myitnge, which rises on the Irrawaddy- Salween watershed, not far from the latter, and flows westwards through the state into Taungbaing or Thibaw, and eventually into the Irrawaddy at Amarapura. The Nam Mao or Shweli only skirts the state, but it receives a considerable tributary, the Nam Paw, which has its entire course in Theinni territory, and is large enough to be barely fordable in the dry weather, and only passable by boats in the rains. The deforestation caused by years of upland cultivation has dried up many of the springs, but as a whole North Theinni is very well watered. Considerable deposits of coal, or rather of lignite, exist in both North and South Theinni, but do not appear to be of high quality. Gold is washed in many of the streams in a fitful way. Limestone exists in large quantities. No valuable timber exists to any considerable extent.

Vegetation
There is some teak in the Nam Yao valley, and scattered wood-oil trees exist. Pine forests cover some of the ranges, but, as elsewhere in the Shan states, varieties of the oak and chestnut are the commonest forest trees.

Climate
The climate of the state as a whole is temperate. In the plains of the uplands there are yearly frosts in January, February and March, but in the greater part of the state the thermometer rarely falls to freezing-point, and in the hot weather does not exceed ninety degrees for any length of time. The average rainfall seems to be about  yearly.

Notes

External links
Satellite map GeoNames

Populated places in Shan State
Former states of Myanmar
Township capitals of Myanmar